Orilesa olearis is a species of moth of the family Tortricidae. It is found in South Africa and Swaziland.

References

Moths described in 1912
Archipini